Pickett's Lock or Picketts Lock is an area of Edmonton, in the London Borough of Enfield. It is bordered by River Lee Navigation to the east, Pickett's Lock Lane to the south, Meridian Way A1055 to the west and the Ponders End industrial area to the north. The area takes its name from Pickett's Lock, a lock on the nearby River Lee Navigation.

History 

Historically the land was marshland and the hamlet here was known as Marshside. During the twentieth century the land was used for sand and gravel extraction which helped to form the waters known as the Blue Lakes. 

The area was used by local people for outdoor pursuits such as shooting, angling, and ferreting, and is described in Terry Webb's book An Edmonton Boy:  "My playground, the River Lea has now been changed into part of the Lee Valley Regional Park; it's been changed into an official playground but it's not the same with things being done for you."

After World War II the lakes were used for landfill. The former gravel workings were a key site for investigation of Pleistocene interglacial deposits.

During the late 1960s the area  was acquired by the Lee Valley Regional Park Authority (LVRPA) to form part of the Lee Valley Park. The Pickett's Lock Sports Centre designed by the Williamson Partnership with J.M.V Bishop of the (LVRPA) It was described in the Buildings of England as being "three large white functional boxes arranged around a central swimming pool, linked by generous circulation areas. Made a little less bleak by additions of 1993-4: restaurant, cafe and cinema, and an entrance block by Fitzroy Robinson & Partners". Also included were a nine-hole golf course and outdoor sports facilities and was completed by 1973 as the largest centre of its kind in Europe. One of the earliest International Events held at the centre was the first World Age Group Trampoline Championships which were organised by Ted Blake.  In later years, land including a disused sewage farm to the north of the centre was used to extend the golf course, and includes a man-made water known as Ponders End lake .

National Athletics Stadium
It  was announced on 24 March 2000 that the site known then as the Lee Valley Leisure Centre was to be the location of the National Athletics Stadium. Shortly afterwards, on 3 April 2000, it was also announced that the site would be the venue of the 2005 World Athletics Championships. The proposed stadium had a capacity of 43,000 and an original cost of £87m and included new training facilities for athletes as part of the design the  High Performance Centre. The project was completely abandoned by the Government in October 2001 on the grounds of increased costs and inadequate transportation links. Ultimately, the UK had to forfeit the right to host the 2005 World Athletics Championships. However, the LVRPA, Sport England and UK Athletics went ahead with plans to create the most modern athletics training venue in the south of England on the site to be known as the Lee Valley Athletics Centre which was formally opened in 2007 and forms part of the Lee Valley Leisure Complex. The original 1973  Pickett Lock Sports Centre closed in 2002 and was demolished in 2004.

In popular culture 
The now demolished Picketts Lock Sports Centre is featured in the BBC comedy Some Mothers Do 'Ave 'Em, with Michael Crawford roller-skating in and around the centre.

References

External links
London High Performance Centre
House of Commons, National Athletic Stadium Summary
Picketts Lock bid Scrapped
MPs Attack Picketts Lock Fiasco
UK National Athletics Stadium
Picketts Lock information

Geography of the London Borough of Enfield
Sport in the London Borough of Enfield
Lee Valley Park
Edmonton, London